The Qatar women's national basketball team represents Qatar in international competitions. It is administrated by the Qatar Basketball Federation.

See also 
 Qatar national under-19 basketball team
 Qatar national under-17 basketball team
 Qatar national 3x3 team

References

External links
Qatar Basketball Federation
Qatar Basketball Records at FIBA Archive
Asia-basket - Qatar Women National Team
Presentation on Facebook

Women's national basketball teams
Women's national sports teams of Qatar
Basketball in Qatar
Basketball teams in Qatar